Marcelo Greuel (born 31 January 1963) is a Brazilian former cyclist. He competed in the 1000m time trial event at the 1984 Summer Olympics.

References

External links
 

1963 births
Living people
Brazilian male cyclists
Brazilian track cyclists
Olympic cyclists of Brazil
Cyclists at the 1984 Summer Olympics
Place of birth missing (living people)